Kenneth Zeller (June 5, 1945 – June 1985) was a teacher and librarian in Toronto, who was employed by Davisville Public School, Williamson Road Junior Public School and Western Technical-Commercial School. He was the victim of a homophobic hate crime when he was beaten to death by five youths in Toronto's High Park. Five young offenders were convicted and sentenced to prison.

The crime received media coverage and was the subject of a play called Steel Kiss, written by Robin Fulford and produced by Buddies in Bad Times theatre. Ken McDougall directed the 1991 Dora Award nominated production which featured Andrew Akman, Michael Waller, Derek Aasland, and Fab Fillippo. Fulford wrote a sequel play, Gulag, in 1996, and the two plays were jointly revived by Buddies in Bad Times in 1999, as a response to the October 1998 murder of Matthew Shepard.

John Greyson also produced a movie called The Making of Monsters, which analyzed the incident through the lens of radical queer activists disrupting the production of a heavily sanitized commercial movie of the week about the incident. It was screened at a number of film festivals in 1991, but was never commercially released for general viewing. 

The incident also spurred the Toronto District School Board into implementing a program designed to eliminate discrimination based on sexual orientation.

The murder of Zeller was dramatized on Killer Kids.

References 

LGBT history in Canada
1985 in Quebec
Crime in Toronto
1985 in Toronto
1985 in LGBT history
1985 murders in Canada
Violence against men in North America